The Guercif barbel (Luciobarbus guercifensis) is a species of ray-finned fish in the genus Luciobarbus. it is endemic to the Moulouya River in Morocco.

References 
 

Guercif barbel
Endemic fauna of Morocco
Freshwater fish of North Africa
Guercif barbel